Black Butte may refer to:

Places
Black Butte (Glenn County, California), a mountain in the Northern Coast Ranges, California
Black Butte (Siskiyou County, California), a volcano in California
Black Butte, California, a community in Siskiyou County, California
Black Butte (Colorado), a mountain in Baca County, Colorado
Black Butte (Stillwater County, Montana), a mountain in Stillwater County, Montana
Black Butte (Madison County, Montana), a peak in the Gravelly Range, Montana
Black Butte (Clark County, Nevada), a summit in Mesquite Valley, Nevada
Black Butte (South Virgin Mountains), a summit northwest of Bitter Ridge in Clark County, Nevada
Black Butte (Oregon), a volcano in Deschutes County
Black Butte Ranch, Oregon, a planned community in Deschutes County
Black Butte, Oregon, a former community in Lane County

Other uses
Black Butte Porter, a beer by Deschutes Brewery

See also
 Black Buttes, an extinct stratovolcano in Washington state
 List of peaks named Black Butte